Bernard von Brentano (15 October 1901, in Offenbach am Main – 29 December 1964, in Wiesbaden) was a German writer, poet, playwright, storyteller, novelist, essayist and journalist.

Life 

Brentano was a son of the Hessian Interior and Justice Minister Otto Rudolf von Brentano di Tremezzo and a brother of Clemens and Heinrich von Brentano. His mother, Lilla Beata née Schwerdt maternally stems from the Frankfurt line of the Brentano family. In contrast to his brothers, Bernard von Brentano hardly used the full name of his family, Brentano di Tremezzo.

Brentano studied philosophy in Freiburg, Munich, Frankfurt and Berlin. In Frankfurt, he became an active member of the catholic student association Bavaria. In Munich he was a member of the K. St. V. Rheno-Bavaria. Brentano became a member of the PEN-Club in 1920. From 1925 to 1930 he worked in the Berlin office of the Frankfurter Zeitung, where he became the successor of Joseph Roth. He was also involved in the Association of proletarian revolutionary writers and worked for the Communist literary magazine Die Linkskurve. A KPD member, he later left the party and distanced himself from politics after some trips to Moscow and because of the party's Stalinist tendencies.

Together with Berthold Brecht and Herbert Ihering he planned to edit the magazine "Krisis und Kritik", which, however, never appeared. In 1933, he emigrated to Switzerland and his family lived in Küsnacht in Zurich. In 1949, he returned from exile back to Germany. He lived with his family in Wiesbaden.

Works 
Über den Ernst des Lebens, 1929
Kapitalismus und schöne Literatur, 1930
Der Beginn der Barbarei in Deutschland, 1932
Berliner Novellen, 1934
Theodor Chindler, 1936
Prozess ohne Richter, 1937
Die ewigen Gefühle, 1939
Une Famille Allemande, 1939
Phädra. Drama, 1939
Tagebuch mit Büchern, 1943
August Wilhelm Schlegel, 1944
Goethe und Marianne von Willemer, 1945
Franziska Scheler, 1945
Martha und Maria, 1946
Streifzüge, 1947
Die Schwestern Usedom, 1948
Sophie Charlotte und Danckelmann, 1949
Du Land der Liebe, 1952

References

Further reading 
 Konrad Feilchenfeldt:Afterword, in: Bernard von Brentano:Three prelates. Essays. Limes, Wiesbaden 1974th (Important for the Assessment of Brentano's later work)
 Ulrike Hessler:Bernard von Brentano. A German writer without Germany. Tendencies of the novel between the Weimar Republic and in exile. Peter Lang, Frankfurt a.m. e.g. 1984th (= European university studies. I. 778th series)
 Deutscher Wirtschaftsverlag (ed.), Handbook of the German Empire, Volume 1, Berlin, 1931

1901 births
1964 deaths
People from Offenbach am Main
People from the Grand Duchy of Hesse
German people of Italian descent
Writers from Hesse
German untitled nobility
Exiles from Nazi Germany
20th-century German novelists
German male novelists
20th-century German poets
20th-century German dramatists and playwrights
German male poets
German male dramatists and playwrights
German essayists
German male essayists
German male journalists
20th-century essayists
20th-century German male writers
People from Küsnacht
20th-century German journalists